List of hospitals in Oklahoma (U.S. state), sorted by hospital name.

A
AllianceHealth Clinton - Clinton
AllianceHealth Durant - Durant
AllianceHealth Madill - Madill
AllianceHealth Midwest - Midwest City
AllianceHealth Ponca City - Ponca City
AllianceHealth Seminole - Seminole
AllianceHealth Woodward - Woodward
AMG Specialty Hospital At Mercy - Edmond
Arbuckle Memorial Hospital - Sulphur
Ascension St. John Broken Arrow - Broken Arrow
Ascension St. John Jane Phillips - Bartlesville
Ascension St. John Medical Center - Tulsa
Ascension St. John Nowata - Nowata
Ascension St. John Owasso - Owasso
Ascension St. John Sapulpa - Sapulpa
Atoka County Medical Center - Atoka

B
Bailey Medical Center - Owasso, Oklahoma
Beaver County Memorial Hospital - Beaver
Bone and Joint Hospital - Oklahoma City
Bristow Medical Center - Bristow
Brookhaven Hospital - Tulsa

C
Cancer Treatment Centers of America - Tulsa
Carl Albert Community Mental Health Center - McAlester
Carnegie Tri-County Municipal Hospital - Carnegie, Oklahoma 
Cedar Ridge Hospital - Oklahoma City
Chickasaw Nation Medical Center -  Ada 
The Children's Center Rehabilitation Hospital - Bethany 
Choctaw Memorial Hospital - Hugo 
Choctaw Nation Health Care Center - Talihina 
Cimarron Memorial Hospital - Boise City 
Claremore Indian Hospital - Claremore 
Cleveland Area Hospital - Cleveland
Comanche County Memorial Hospital - Lawton
Community Hospital - Oklahoma City
Community Hospital - North Campus - Oklahoma City
Cordell Memorial Hospital - Cordell
Cornerstone Specialty Hospitals Shawnee - Shawnee
Cornerstone Specialty Hospitals Muskogee - Muskogee
Creek Nation Community Hospital - Okemah
Curahealth Hospital Oklahoma City - South Campus - Oklahoma City
Curahealth Hospital Oklahoma City - Oklahoma City

D
Deaconess Hospital - Oklahoma City
Drumright Regional Hospital - Drumright
Duncan Regional Hospital - Duncan

E
Eastern Oklahoma Medical Center - Poteau
Elkview General Hospital - Hobart

F
Fairfax Community Hospital - Fairfax
Fairview Regional Medical Center - Fairview

G
Grady Memorial Hospital - Chickasha
Great Plains Regional Medical Center - Elk City
Griffin Memorial Hospital - Norman

H
Harmon Memorial Hospital - Hollis
Harper County Community Hospital - Buffalo
Haskell County Community Hospital - Stigler
Hillcrest Hospital Claremore - Claremore
Hillcrest Hospital Cushing - Cushing
Hillcrest Hospital Henryetta - Henryetta
Hillcrest Hospital Pryor - Pryor
Hillcrest Hospital South (was SouthCrest Hospital) - Tulsa
Hillcrest Medical Center - Tulsa
Holdenville General Hospital - Holdenville

I
Inspire Specialty Hospital - Midwest City
INTEGRIS Baptist Medical Center - Oklahoma City
INTEGRIS Bass Baptist Health Center - Enid
INTEGRIS Bass Pavilion - Enid
INTEGRIS Canadian Valley Hospital - Yukon
INTEGRIS Community Hospital At Council Crossing - Oklahoma City
INTEGRIS Grove Hospital - Grove
INTEGRIS Health Edmond - Edmond
INTEGRIS Jim Thorpe Rehabilitation - Oklahoma City
INTEGRIS Miami Hospital - Miami
INTEGRIS Southwest Medical Center - Oklahoma City

J
Jackson C. Memorial VA Medical Center - Muskogee
Jackson County Memorial Hospital - Altus
JD McCarty Center for Children - Norman
Jefferson County Hospital - Waurika 
Jim Taliaferro Community Mental Health Center - Lawton

L
Lakeside Women's Hospital - Oklahoma City
Laureate Psychiatric Clinic and Hospital - Tulsa
Lawton Indian Hospital - Lawton
Lindsay Municipal Hospital - Lindsay

M
Mangum Regional Medical Center - Mangum
Mary Hurley Hospital - Coalgate
McAlester Regional Health Center - McAlester
McBride Orthopedic Hospital - Oklahoma City
McCurtain Memorial Hospital - Idabel
Medical Center of Southeastern OK - Durant
Memorial Hospital of Stilwell - Stilwell
Memorial Hospital of Texas County - Guymon
Mercy Health Love County - Marietta
Mercy Hospital Ada - Ada
Mercy Hospital Ardmore - Ardmore
Mercy Hospital Healdton - Healdton
Mercy Hospital Kingfisher - Kingfisher
Mercy Hospital Logan County - Guthrie
Mercy Hospital Oklahoma City - Oklahoma City
Mercy Hospital Tishomingo - Tishomingo
Mercy Hospital Watonga - Watonga
Mercy Rehabilitation Hospital Oklahoma City - Oklahoma City
Muscogee (Creek) Nation Medical Center - Okmulgee
Muscogee (Creek) Nation Physical Rehabilitation - Okmulgee

N
Newman Memorial Hospital - Shattuck 
Norman Regional HealthPlex - Norman
Norman Regional Hospital Porter Campus - Norman
Norman Regional Hospital Moore - Moore
Norman Specialty Hospital - Norman
Northeastern Health System - Tahlequah
Northeastern Health System Sequoyah - Sequoyah
Northwest Center for Behavioral Health - Woodward
Northwest Surgical Hospital - Oklahoma City

O
Oakwood Springs - Oklahoma City
OK Center for Orthopaedic & Multi-Specialty Hospital - Oklahoma City
Okeene Municipal Hospital - Okeene
Oklahoma ER & Hospital - Edmond
Oklahoma Forensic Center - Vinita
Oklahoma City Veterans Administration Hospital - Oklahoma City
Oklahoma Heart Hospital - Oklahoma City
Oklahoma Hearth Hospital South - Oklahoma City
Oklahoma Spine Hospital - Oklahoma City
Oklahoma State University Medical Center - Tulsa
Oklahoma Surgical Hospital - Tulsa
OneCore Health - Oklahoma City
OU Medical Center - Oklahoma City
OU Medical Center - Edmond
OU Medical Center, The Children's Hospital - Oklahoma City

P
Parkside Psychiatric Hospital Clinic - Tulsa
Pawhuska Hospital - Pawhuska 
Physicians Hospital in Anadarko - Anadarko
Post Acute Medical Rehabilitation Hospital of Tulsa - Tulsa
Prague Community Hospital - Prague
Purcell Municipal Hospital - Purcell
Pushmataha Hospital - Antlers

R
Roger Mills Memorial Hospital - Cheyenne 
Rolling Hills Hospital - Ada

S
Saint Francis Hospital - Tulsa
Saint Francis Hospital Muskogee - Muskogee
Saint Francis Hospital South - Tulsa
Saint Francis Hospital Vinita - Vinita
Seiling Regional Medical Center - Seiling 
Select Specialty Hospital Oklahoma City - Oklahoma City
Select Specialty Hospital in Tulsa - Tulsa
Share Medical Center - Alva 
Southwestern Medical Center - Lawton
Southwestern Regional Medical Center - Tulsa
St. Anthony Hospital - Oklahoma City
St. Anthony Hospital Shawnee - Shawnee
St. John Rehabilitation Hospital/Encompass Health -  Broken Arrow
St. Mary's Regional Medical Center - Enid
Stillwater Medical Blackwell - Blackwell
Stillwater Medical Center - Stillwater
Stillwater Medical Perry - Perry
Stroud Regional Medical Center - Stroud
Summit Medical Center - Edmond
Surgical Hospital of Oklahoma - Oklahoma City

T
Tulsa Center for Behavioral Health - Tulsa
Tulsa ER & Hospital - Tulsa
Tulsa Spine & Specialty Hospital - Tulsa

V
Valir Rehabilitation Hospital - Oklahoma City
Veterans Affairs Medical Center of Oklahoma City - Oklahoma City

W
Wagoner Community Hospital - Wagoner 
Weatherford Regional Hospital - Weatherford 
Willow Crest Hospital - Miami
WW Hastings Indian Hospital - Tahlequah

See also
American Hospital Association
List of hospitals in the United States
Oklahoma Hospital Association

External links
Oklahoma Hospital Association (the OHA)
List of Oklahoma hospitals according to the OHA

Oklahoma
 
Hospitals